Trenutak istine is a Croatian franchise of the game show The Moment of Truth, produced by Nova TV crew in HD technology. Trenutak istine puts participants to the test -- the polygraph test -- to reveal whether or not they are telling the truth for a chance to win a great prize of 500,000 HRK (c. €69,000). First season show started in September 2008 and was broadcast Tuesdays at 9 pm, and the second season started in the fall of 2009. It is hosted by journalist Jasna Nanut.

Trenutak istine gained significant attention in the Croatian media and is one of the most controversial Croatian TV programs in recent years. In February 2009, the Croatian Psychological Association started a petition to ban the show, describing it as exploitative and morally corrupting.

The Serbian version, produced by RTV Pink and hosted by Tatjana Vojtehovski, carries the same name. The top prize is 5,000,000 RSD (c. €50,000).

References

External links
http://trenutakistine.novatv.hr/ 
Trenutak istine - TV show koji je prepun gadosti. Zašto ga onda uopće gledamo? 
http://www.rtvpink.com/trenutakistine/ 

2008 Croatian television series debuts
2009 Croatian television series endings
Croatian television series
2000s game shows
Nova TV (Croatia) original programming